The 2020 Cheddar's 300, branded as Cheddar's 300 presented by Alsco, was a NASCAR Xfinity Series race held on June 1, 2020—postponed from May 30 due to weather—at Bristol Motor Speedway in Bristol, Tennessee. Contested over 303 laps—extended from 300 laps due to an overtime finish, on the  concrete short track, it was the seventh race of the 2020 NASCAR Xfinity Series season. Additionally, it was the qualifier for the season's first Dash 4 Cash race. JR Motorsports driver Noah Gragson took home his second win of the season.

The race was originally scheduled to be held on April 4, but was rescheduled due to the COVID-19 pandemic. In turn, the race was postponed from May 30 due to inclement weather.

Report

Background 

Bristol Motor Speedway, formerly known as Bristol International Raceway and Bristol Raceway, is a NASCAR short track venue located in Bristol, Tennessee. Constructed in 1960, it held its first NASCAR race on July 30, 1961. Despite its short length, Bristol is among the most popular tracks on the NASCAR schedule because of its distinct features, which include extraordinarily steep banking, an all concrete surface, two pit roads, and stadium-like seating.

The race was held without fans in attendance due to the ongoing COVID-19 pandemic.

Dash 4 Cash 
The Dash 4 Cash is a series of four races in the NASCAR Xfinity Series, preceded by a qualifying race. The top four points-eligible drivers in the previous race are eligible to win a $100,000 bonus on top of their race winnings if they win the race. Cup Series regulars are not permitted to compete in the races.

The Cheddar's 300 served as the qualifier for the season's first Dash 4 Cash race at Atlanta Motor Speedway on June 6.

Entry list 

 (R) denotes rookie driver.
 (i) denotes driver who is ineligible for series driver points.

Qualifying 
Harrison Burton was awarded the pole for the race as determined by a random draw.

Starting Lineup 

 The No. 07 of Carson Ware had to start from the rear due to unapproved adjustments. The No. 99 of Mason Massey also had to start from the back.

Race

Race results

Stage Results 
Stage One

Laps: 85

Stage Two

Laps: 85

Final Stage Results 

Laps: 130

Race statistics 

 Lead changes: 10 among 6 different drivers
 Cautions/Laps: 12 for 85
 Red flags: 1
 Time of race: 2 hours, 19 minutes, 3 seconds
 Average speed:

Media

Television 
The Cheddar's 300 was carried by FS1 in the United States. Adam Alexander and the Busch brothers (Kurt & Kyle Busch) called the race from the Fox Sports Studio in Charlotte, with Regan Smith covering pit road.

Radio 
The Performance Racing Network (PRN) called the race for radio, which was simulcast on SiriusXM NASCAR Radio. Doug Rice and Mark Garrow anchored the action from the booth and Rob Albright called the race from the backstretch. Brad Gillie, Brett McMillan, and Wendy Venturini provided reports from pit road.

Standings after the race 

 Drivers' Championship standings

 Note: Only the first 12 positions are included for the driver standings.
 . – Driver has clinched a position in the NASCAR playoffs.

References 

2020 NASCAR Xfinity Series
Cheddars 300
NASCAR races at Bristol Motor Speedway
2020 in sports in Tennessee
Cheddars 300